"Come Anytime" is a song by Australian rock group Hoodoo Gurus. It was released in May 1989 as the lead single from the group's fourth studio album, Magnum Cum Louder. "Come Anytime" peaked at number 27 on The Australian charts and at number 1 on the Billboard Modern Rock Tracks. 

In June 2000, Dave Faulkner said "'Come Anytime'... best described as a romantic song about an unromantic subject but you can reverse the adjectives and the statement would be equally correct."

"Come Anytime" is used as the theme song for the Original Australian version of Thank God You're Here and the American version.

Track listing
 CD single (CCD005)
 "Come Anytime" — 3:22
 "Cajun Country" — 4:08
 "Hallucination" — 5:04

 7" single (105062)
 "Come Anytime" — 3:22
 "Cajun Country" — 4:08

Personnel
Credits:
 Richard Grossman — bass, backing vocals
 Dave Faulkner — lead vocals, guitar, keyboards
 Mark Kingsmill — drums, vocals (grunts)
 Brad Shepherd — guitar, backing vocals, harmonica
 Producer — Hoodoo Gurus
 Engineer — Alan Thorne
 Mixer — David Thoener

Charts

See also
List of Billboard number-one alternative singles of the 1980s

References

1989 songs
1989 singles
Hoodoo Gurus songs
Songs written by Dave Faulkner (musician)
RCA Records singles